Ilyinka is an urban locality (work settlement) in Ikryaninsky District of Astrakhan Oblast, Russia. Population:

References

Notes

Sources

Urban-type settlements in Astrakhan Oblast